The Mexican National Championships (Campeonatos Nacionales in Spanish) is a group of Lucha libre professional wrestling championships that are sanctioned by Comisión de Box y Lucha Libre Mexico D.F. ("the Mexico City Boxing and Wrestling Commission" in Spanish). While the Commission sanctions the championships, it does not promote the events in which the championships are defended. Being professional wrestling championships, they are not won legitimately; they are instead won via a scripted ending to a match or awarded to a wrestler or wrestlers as a result of a storyline. The earliest Mexican National Championship, the Mexican National Heavyweight Championship, was created as far back as 1926. The Mexican National Welterweight Championship crowned its first champion on June 17, 1934, making it the oldest, still active, professional wrestling championship. Eléctrico, the current Lightweight champion, is the longest reigning Mexican National Championship, having won the title on August 13, 2013. Atlantis, the reigning Light Heavyweight Champion, has the shortest active reign of any champion, having defeated Mephisto for the championship on August 25, 2015.

Over the years the Commission has created a total of 13 different championships, seven of which for various weight divisions in Mexico. Three of the championships are for various forms of male tag teams. They also created two championships for Women's professional wrestling, a singles championship and a tag team championship. From 1993 through 2006 the commission sanctioned the Mexican National Mini-Estrella Championship, exclusively for the Mini-Estrella championship. Since 2008 the Mexican National Lightweight Championship has been modified to be for Mini-Estrellas division. The Commission's most recent championship addition was in 1996 when they created the Mexican National Atómicos Championship, contested for by teams of four. Of the 13 championships, only five remain active. The individual promotions have the promotional control of the championship while the Commission only serves to approve the champions and supervise championship matches. The Commission normally approve all champions but has on occasion decided to vacate a championship if the promotions did not follow the Commissions' guidelines. One instance was in 1957 when Mishima Ota won the Lightweight championship, deeming him ineligible because he was a Japanese citizen. Originally the Commission also stated that championships could not be defended in anything other than normal matches, stripping Psicosis II of the championship for defending the Mexican National Middleweight Championship in a hardcore match. At a later point they allowed the Heavyweight Championship to be defended in a Steel cage match.

The Mexican National Championships have been promoted by a number of Mexican-based wrestling promotions over the years. Founded in 1933 Consejo Mundial de Lucha Libre (CMLL), has promoted Mexican National Championships since its inception and currently promotes five of the championships, the Lightweight, Light Heavyweight, Welterweight, Women's, and Trios championships. Over the years CMLL has promoted every single Mexican National Championship except the Atómicos, Featherweight and Cruiserweight Championship. In 1992 Asistencia Asesoría y Administración, later known simply as "AAA", was formed when a number of CMLL wrestlers broke away to create a new company. Several of the wrestlers that left were reigning Mexican National Champions and the Mexico City Boxing and Wrestling commission allowed AAA to take promotional control of those championships at that point. Of the championships. In 2008 AAA abandoned all Mexican National Championships, ending the Middleweight, Atómicos and Tag Team Championship. In 2006 then Mini-Estrellas champion Mascarita Sagrada left AAA while still holding the championship, there was no subsequent announcement that the title was vacated, rendering it inactive from that point on. The Commission recognized the Mexican National Women's Tag Team Championship for just under 7 years, creating it for CMLL's Women's division and abandoning it when CMLL practically stopped promoting women's wrestling in 1997.

Championship overview
Key

Mexican National Heavyweight Championship (1926–)

The Mexican National Heavyweight Championship is the oldest actively promotion championship in the world, created in 1926 it predates the NWA Worlds Heavyweight Championship that was created in 1948 and is the oldest US based championship. The first champion was Fransisco Aguayo, winning the championship at a time where most wrestling shows were promoted by US-based promoters. In 1933, Salvador Lutteroth formed Empresa Mexicana de Lucha Libre ("Mexican Wrestling Enterprise"; EMLL) and was granted permission by the Mexico City Boxing and Wrestling Commission for the control of the Mexican National Heavyweight Championship. In 1992, then-reigning champion Rayo de Jalisco Jr. left EMLL to join the newly created Asistencia Asesoría y Administración (AAA), taking the heavyweight championship with him to AAA. When Héctor Garza died while champion in 2013, it became inactive, with no champion holding the title for four years. In October 2017, Consejo Mundial de Lucha Libre ("World Wrestling Council"; CMLL, formerly EMLL) brought the championship back under their control.

Mexican National Middleweight Championship (1933–1993)

Yaqui Joe was the first champion and the championship was soon defended on EMLL shows as well as on the Mexican independent circuit. Over time EMLL gained almost total control of the championship as they grew to become Mexico's largest promotion at the time. In 1992, Antonio Peña founded Asistencia Asesoría y Administración, taking a number of CMLL wrestlers with him. One of these wrestlers, was the then-reigning National Middleweight Champion Octagón, who took the championship with him to AAA. Blue Panther winning the championship pn July 27, 1992, signaled that the commission had granted AAA control of the championship and taken it away from CMLL.

Mexican National Welterweight Championship (1934–)

Mario Nuñez became the first champion when he defeated Tony Canales in the final of a tournament. The welterweight championship remained under CMLL's control when AAA was created in 1992, and remains under their control to this date. Karloff Lagarde holds all "longevity" records for the championship. He has had the longest individual reign (1,859 days), the longest combined reign (2,731 days) and the most reigns of any champion, with four. Psicosis holds the record for the shortest reign, having held the title for only two days.

Footnotes

References

External links
Mexican National Championships at wrestling-titles.com

 
Professional wrestling-related lists
Professional wrestling champion lists